Stormont Mancroft Samuel Mancroft, 2nd Baron Mancroft  (27 July 1914 – 14 September 1987), born Stormont Mancroft Samuel, was a British Conservative politician.

Early life
Mancroft was the son of Arthur Samuel, 1st Baron Mancroft, and Phoebe Fletcher. In 1925 he assumed by deed poll the surname "Mancroft". He was educated at Winchester College, Kingsgate House (K), Christ Church, Oxford, obtaining a law degree, and Bonn University, where he studied music. In 1938 he became a barrister at the Inner Temple. He served in the Second World War as a Lieutenant-Colonel in the British Army, was twice Mentioned in Despatches and awarded the Croix de Guerre.

Political career
After the war, he served in the Conservative administrations of Winston Churchill and Anthony Eden as a government whip from 1952 to 1954 and as Under-Secretary of State for the Home Department from 1954 to 1957. When Harold Macmillan became Prime Minister in January 1957, Mancroft was appointed Parliamentary Secretary to the Minister of Defence, Duncan Sandys, a post he held until June the same year, and was then Minister without Portfolio from 1957 to 1958.

Writing
He was a frequent contributor of humorous articles to Punch magazine and other publications. Three books of his articles have been published:
"Booking the Cooks", 1969.
"A Chinaman in My Bath, and Other Pieces", 1974.
"Bees in some Bonnets", 1979.
Over half of the third book consists of material published in the previous two books.

Family
Lord Mancroft married Diana Lloyd, daughter of Lieutenant-Colonel Horace Lloyd, on 8 May 1951. They have three children:
Hon. Victoria Lucinda Mancroft (7 March 1952), married Prince Frederick Nicholas of Prussia (son of Prince Frederick of Prussia) on 27 February 1980.
Hon. Jessica Rosetta Mancroft (10 May 1954), married Simon Dickinson on 15 October 1983.
Benjamin Mancroft, 3rd Baron Mancroft (16 May 1957), married Emma Louisa Peart on 20 September 1990.

Diana Lloyd was married before to Richard Bridges St. John Quarry. They have two daughters : Miranda, Countess of Stockton (1947–2020), and Venetia, Mrs Frederick Barker, then Viscountess Wimborne

Arms

References

Kidd, Charles, Williamson, David (editors). Debrett's Peerage and Baronetage (1990 edition). New York: St Martin's Press, 1990.

External links

1914 births
1987 deaths
Politicians from London
British people of Jewish descent
British Ashkenazi Jews
Barons in the Peerage of the United Kingdom
Knights Commander of the Order of the British Empire
Conservative Party (UK) Baronesses- and Lords-in-Waiting
People educated at Winchester College
Royal Artillery officers
British Army personnel of World War II
Jewish British politicians
20th-century British politicians
20th-century British businesspeople
Ministers in the third Churchill government, 1951–1955
Ministers in the Eden government, 1955–1957
Ministers in the Macmillan and Douglas-Home governments, 1957–1964